Village Pakhar Hill Town is a village of the district of Poonch, Rawalakot Tehsil (20 km from Rawalakot) in Pakistan administered Azad Kashmir. It covers an area about 2 square miles.

 Population:
According to union Council its population is 5000 to 6000 approximately.
 Language:
The language spoken there is paarhi. It comes in the way while going from Rawalakot to Tolipeer.
 Religion:
Islam is the dominant religion in this village and almost the whole population belongs to Sunni sect.
 Clothing:
People wear Shalwar Qameez as a common dress and the lifestyle is very simple.
 Problems:
Due to lack of opportunities people travel to the cities for the sake of profession. Wood is used as a fuel because it is not facilitated with natural gas yet.
 Games:
Cricket and volleyball are the most common games played there.
 Other Information:
It is about 7000 feet above from the sea level therefore the temperature in winter is very low and in summer it is quite moderate.

References

Populated places in Poonch District, Pakistan